is a private women's junior college in Yamato, Kanagawa Prefecture, Japan, established in 1950. The predecessor of the school was founded in 1945 for study of the fine arts, and later expanded to include children's care and social studies. The school is affiliated with the Roman Catholic Church. Its present name was adopted in 2004.

External links
 Official website  

Educational institutions established in 1950
Private universities and colleges in Japan
Japanese junior colleges
Universities and colleges in Kanagawa Prefecture
Women's universities and colleges in Japan
Catholic universities and colleges in Japan
1950 establishments in Japan